The 1924 German federal election may refer to:

 May 1924 German federal election
 December 1924 German federal election